Decoster's house was a landmark location during the Battle of Waterloo. It stood on the eastern side of the Waterloo–Genappe main road south of the junction with the minor road to Plancenoit (south La Belle Alliance and north the farm of Rossomme). According to Jean-Baptiste Decoster Napoleon spent the early part of the Battle of Waterloo and around Rossomme and then at about 17:00 moved to a position near Decoster's house where he remained until about 19:00.

History
The smallholding belong to Jean-Baptiste Decoster who was an unwilling local guide for Napoleon Bonaparte and his reminiscence from an important primary source for the locations where Napoleon resided during the battle, including a hillock or a mound close to his house. According to Decoster Napoleon spent the early part in and around Rossomme and then at about 17:00 moved to a position near Decoster's house where he remained until about 19:00.

The house was used by Decoster as a small inn or "cabaret". Decoster's house is not marked on the Ferraris van kaart of 1777, but the tracks and roads in the area are and the location of the house was recorded in documents written shortly after the battle.

See also
 List of Waterloo Battlefield locations

Notes

References

 starts: "Jean-Baptiste Decoster ..."

Further reading
 — "La Belle—Alliance est situéésur la route de Charleroi à 500 mètres au nord de la maison De Coster"
 — "Decoster was a Flemish peasant, owning a tiny farm on the east-side of the Brussels-road, between La Belle Alliance and the farm of Rossomme, about 800 metre north of this farm, in the corner of the road and the track leading to Plancenoit."

Waterloo Battlefield locations